This is a list of rivers in Benin. This list is arranged west to east by drainage basin, with respective tributaries indented under each larger stream's name.

Volta River (Ghana)
Oti River
Kara River
Pendjari River
Mono River
Couffo River (Kouffo River)
Ouémé River
Zou River
Agbado River
Okpara River
Alpouro River
Niger River
Oli River 
Sota River
Bouli River
Tassiné River
Alibori River
Pako River
Mékrou River

References
Rand McNally, The New International Atlas, 1993.

Benin
Rivers